John Barton Grimwood (25 October 1898 – 1977) was an English footballer who played as a half-back. He joined Manchester United in May 1919, and made his debut for the club in the first Manchester derby on 11 October 1919, as a replacement for Lal Hilditch, who was away on international duty. Able to play in all three half-back positions, he was a utility player for the club. He helped United gain promotion to the First Division in the 1924-25 season. However, he suffered a knee injury for most of the next season, and needed to undergo an operation. In 1925-26, he played at centre-half regularly, sharing the position with Frank Barson. After scoring eight goals in 205 appearances for United, he left the club for Aldershot Town in June 1927. He later joined Blackpool and Altrincham.

Personal life
Grimwood was born in Marsden, South Shields. Following retirement, he ran an ice cream shop in Davyhulme.

References

1898 births
1977 deaths
English footballers
South Shields F.C. (1889) players
Manchester United F.C. players
Aldershot F.C. players
Blackpool F.C. players
Altrincham F.C. players
Association football midfielders